Daði Lárusson (born 19 June 1973) is an Icelandic former footballer who played as a goalkeeper.

International career
Lárusson made his debut for Iceland only at the age of 32 in an October 2005 friendly match against Poland, coming on as a substitute for another veteran, 34-year-old Kristján Finnbogason. He has been capped three times.

References
 
 
 

1973 births
Living people
Association football goalkeepers
Dadi Larusson
Dadi Larusson
Dadi Larusson
Jacksonville Cyclones players
Expatriate soccer players in the United States